The Meads Cup is a rugby union trophy named after King Country and All Blacks player Colin Meads. It is contested during the Heartland Championship. It was first awarded in 2006, when the Heartland Championship format was introduced.

Competition

Regular season
At present, all 12 Heartland Championship teams play 8 games over 8 weeks before the finals. Once finished, the top 4 advance to the Meads Cup finals. The teams ranked 5-8 play for the Lochore Cup. Previously, a pool system was used between 2006 and 2010.

Finals
The Meads Cup winner is determined in four-team single-elimination tournament. The semi-final matchups are seeded 1-4 and 2–3, with the higher seed receiving home field advantage. The highest remaining seed hosts the Meads Cup final.

Winners

See also
 Lochore Cup
 Heartland Championship
 New Zealand Heartland XV
 National Provincial Championship (1976–2005)
 National Provincial Championship (2006–present)

References

Heartland Championship
Rugby union trophies and awards
New Zealand sports trophies and awards